Madagascar is divided into 23 regions (faritra). These formerly second-tier administrative divisions became first-level administrative divisions when the former six provinces were dissolved on 4 October 2009.

Elections 
Elections for the regional councils were held on 16 March 2008.

See also 
 Subdivisions of Madagascar 
 Districts of Madagascar
List of regions of Madagascar by Human Development Index
 List of cities in Madagascar

References

Sources 
 Population, area: Madagascar: Profil des marchés pour les évaluations d’urgence de la sécurité alimentaire 
 (in French:) Découpage Territorial - L'Express.mg

 
Subdivisions of Madagascar
Madagascar, Regions
Madagascar 2
Regions, Madagascar
Madagascar geography-related lists